Counter-rotating propellers, also referred to as CRP, are propellers which turn in opposite directions to each other. They are used on some twin- and multi-engine propeller-driven aircraft.

The propellers on most conventional twin-engined aircraft turn clockwise (as viewed from behind the engine). Counter-rotating propellers generally turn clockwise on the left engine and counterclockwise on the right. The advantage of such designs is that counter-rotating propellers balance the effects of torque and P-factor, meaning that such aircraft do not have a critical engine in the case of engine failure.

Drawbacks of counter-rotating propellers come from the fact that, in order to reverse the rotation of one propeller, either one propeller must have an additional reversing gearbox, or the engines themselves must be adapted to turn in opposite directions. (Meaning that there are essentially two engine designs, one with left-turning and the other with right-turning parts, which complicates manufacture and maintenance.)

History
Counter-rotating propellers have been used since the earliest days of aviation, in order to avoid the aircraft tipping sideways from the torque reaction against propellers turning in the a single direction. They were fitted to the very first controlled powered aeroplane, the Wright Flyer, and to other subsequent types such as the Dunne D.1 of 1907 and the more successful Dunne D.5 of 1910.

In designing the Lockheed P-38 Lightning, the decision was made to reverse the counter-rotation such that the tops of the propeller arcs move outwards (counterclockwise on the left and clockwise on the right), away from each other. Tests on the initial XP-38 prototype demonstrated greater accuracy in gunnery with the unusual configuration.

The counter-rotating powerplants of the German World War II Junkers Ju 288 prototype series (as the Bomber B contract winning design), the Gotha Go 244 light transport, Henschel Hs 129 ground attack aircraft, Heinkel He 177A heavy bomber and Messerschmitt Me 323 transport used the same rotational "sense" as the production P-38 did – this has also been done for the modern American Bell Boeing V-22 Osprey tiltrotor VTOL military aircraft design. The following German World War II aviation engines were designed as opposing-rotation pairs for counter-rotation needs:
 BMW 801A and B, and G/H subtypes
 Daimler-Benz DB 604
 Daimler-Benz DB 606
 Daimler-Benz DB 610
 Junkers Jumo 222

The aerodynamics of a propeller on one side of an aircraft change according to which way it turns, as it affects the P-factor. This can in turn affect performance under extreme conditions and therefore flight safety certification. Some modern types, such as the Airbus A400M, have counter-rotating propellers in order to meet air safety requirements under engine-out conditions.

List of aircraft with counter-rotating propellers

See also

References 
Notes

Bibliography

 Gunston, Bill. Jane's Aerospace Dictionary. London, England. Jane's Publishing Company Ltd, 1980. 

 
Aircraft engines
Propellers
Aircraft configurations